Zindagi Tere Naam is a 2012 Indian Hindi-language romance film directed by Ashu Trikha, starring Mithun Chakraborty and Ranjeeta. The film was completed in 2008, but released only in 2012 with limited prints. The film is based on the American Nicholas Sparks' novel The Notebook and the 2004 movie of the same name.

Plot 
The film starts with an old man, named Mr. Singh, narrating a story to an old woman as her memory is slipping day by day. Mr. Singh tells about young lovers Siddharth and Anjali. Anjali is a rich girl, but Siddharth is a poor man's son. Anjali's father disapproves this affair and takes the daughter away. Dejected Siddharth starts writing letters to her. He writes 365 letters in that entire year, but never hears from Anjali. She believes that he has forgotten her. Years pass and Anjali could not find Siddharth, so she eventually plans to settle down with another man. But destiny had other ideas and the two lovers meet again. As the flashback ends, the film goes back to the elder couple. The old woman realizes that Mr. Singh was telling the story about their own love story, and her memories of the past come rushing back.  Mr. Singh is briefly happy, but his wife's memory leaves again.

Trivia 
In Zindagi Tere Naam, Mithun Chakraborty worked again with his frequent co-star Ranjeeta Kaur after 22 years. The last time they were paired together was in Gunahon Ka Devta in 1990. They were paired in many 1980s films like Baazi, Ghar Ek Mandir, Tarana, Suraksha, Taqdeer Ka Badshah, Bhayaanak, Unees-Bees, Hum Se Badkar Kaun and Dhuaan.

Cast 
 Mithun Chakraborty as Siddharth Singh
 Ashish Sharma as Vishal
 Ranjeeta Kaur as Mrs. Anjali Singh
 Aseem Ali Khan as Young Siddharth Singh
 Priyanka Mehta as Young Anjali
 Dalip Tahil as Anjali's father
 Supriya Karnik as Anjali's mother
 Sharat Saxena as Siddharth's father
 Himani Shivpuri as Nurse
 Yatin Karyekar as Doctor
 Dia Mirza as Item Number
 Sajid in a special appearance

Soundtrack 

As the movie was completed in 2008, the music of the movie was released on 13 June 2008. Soon before the release of movie in 2012, the most anticipated track of the movie was "Tu Mujhe Soch Kabhi" by KK.

References

External links 
 
 http://www.bollywoodhungama.com/moviemicro/cast/id/503176/Zindagi+Tere+Naam

2012 films
2010s Hindi-language films
2010s Urdu-language films
2012 romantic drama films
Indian romantic drama films
Films based on American novels
Films based on romance novels
Films based on works by Nicholas Sparks
Indian remakes of American films
Films directed by Ashu Trikha